Boscobelle is a populated place in the parish of Saint Peter, Barbados.

See also
 List of cities, towns and villages in Barbados

References

Further reading
 
 

Saint Peter, Barbados
Populated coastal places in Barbados
Populated places in Barbados